Single deposit is one-time lump sum investment. The Investment is made at the start of the period; grows over the period and matures at the end of the period. Examples of a single deposit are certificates of deposit or Fixed Deposits.

Real World Example

Ericka has 5,000.00 USD for her daughter's wedding. She may need the money after 4 years. She is planning to invest the money for the period. Her bank offers her an interest rate of 3.50% per annum compounded annually on a new CD (certificate of deposit) that she opens. 

Input

Returns

See also
 Rate of return on investment
 Finance
 Interest
 Periodic deposit

References

Investment